"Skeletons" is a song performed by Azerbaijani band Dihaj. The song represented Azerbaijan in the Eurovision Song Contest 2017. The song was revealed to the public on 11 March 2017, and was released as a digital download on 15 March. The song is composed by Isa Melikov and Sandra Bjurman, who composed the country's 2011 winning entry "Running Scared".

Eurovision Song Contest

Dihaj was confirmed to be the Azerbaijani representative to the Eurovision Song Contest 2017 on 5 December 2016. The music video to her entry, "Skeletons", was later revealed on 11 March 2017. Azerbaijan competed in the first half of the first semi-final at the Eurovision Song Contest in which she qualified to the final. She was 12th in the running order of the grand final and finished in 14th place including 42 points from televote (11th place) and 78 points from the juries (12th place).

Track listing

Charts

Release history

References 

Eurovision songs of Azerbaijan
Eurovision songs of 2017
2017 songs
2017 singles
Songs written by Sandra Bjurman